The girls' singles event of the 2017 BWF World Junior Championships in badminton was held on 16–22 October. The defending champion was Chen Yufei from China.

Seeds 

  Phittayaporn Chaiwan (quarterfinals)
  Yeo Jia Min (fifth round)
  Gregoria Mariska Tunjung (champion)
  Goh Jin Wei (semifinals)
  Han Yue (final)
  Cai Yanyan (semifinals)
  Asuka Takahashi (fifth round)
  Aakarshi Kashyap (fourth round)

  Chasinee Korepap (fifth round)
  Chananchida Jucharoen (quarter-finals)
  Maria Delcheva (third round)
  Vivien Sandorhazi (fourth round)
  Huang Yin-hsuan (fourth round)
  Reka Madarasz (second round)
  Tereza Svabikova (third round)
  Choirunnisa (fifth round)

Draw

Finals

Top half

Section 1

Section 2

Section 3

Section 4

Section 5

Section 6

Section 7

Section 8

Bottom half

Section 9

Section 10

Section 11

Section 12

Section 13

Section 14

Section 15

Section 16

References

2017 BWF World Junior Championships